Laurel is a city in and the second county seat of Jones County, Mississippi, United States. As of the 2020 census, the city had a population of 17,161. It is located northeast of Ellisville, the first county seat, which contains the first county courthouse. Laurel has the second county courthouse as there are two judicial districts in Jones County. Laurel is the headquarters of the Jones County Sheriff's Department, which administers in the county. Laurel is the principal city of a micropolitan statistical area named for it. Major employers include Howard Industries, Sanderson Farms, Masonite International, Family Health Center, Howse Implement, Thermo-Kool, and South Central Regional Medical Center. Laurel is home to the Lauren Rogers Museum of Art, Mississippi's oldest art museum, established by the family of Lauren Eastman Rogers.

History

Following the 1881 construction of the New Orleans and Northeastern Railroad through the area, economic development occurred rapidly. The city of Laurel was incorporated in 1882, with timber as the impetus. Yellow pine forests in the region fueled the industry. The city was named for thickets of mountain laurel (Kalmia latifolia) which were native to the original town site.

Located in the heart of the piney woods ecoregion of the southeastern United States, the land site that would eventually become Laurel was densely covered with forests of virgin longleaf pine, making the area an attractive one to pioneering lumberjacks and sawmill operators in the late 19th century.

In 1881, business partners John Kamper and A.M. Lewin constructed a small lumber mill on the New Orleans and Northeastern Railroad. Kamper and Lewin's mill was located in an area that would later become Laurel's First Avenue. The following year, in response to a U.S. Postal Service request to provide a postal delivery name for their mill and its surrounding lumber camp, Kamper and Lewin submitted the name "Lawrell" as an homage to the area's naturally-growing mountain laurel bushes. The peculiar spelling, however, was soon "corrected" by federal postal officials, giving the future town its current spelling.

During its first decade or so, Laurel existed as little more than a glorified lumber camp surrounding Kamper and Lewin's primitive sawmill. By 1891, Kamper's company was on the verge of bankruptcy, leading Kamper to sell the mill and extensive land holdings in the area (more than 15,000 acres), to Clinton, Iowa, lumber barons Lauren Chase Eastman and George and Silas Gardiner, founders of the Eastman-Gardiner Company.

After completing the purchase, Eastman and the Gardiner brothers decided to make substantial improvements to their Laurel lumber operations by  constructing a new and much larger, state-of-the-art lumber mill. In 1893, the new Eastman-Gardiner Company mill began operations, using the best technology and labor-saving devices of the day.

By the early 1900s, the success of Eastman-Gardner Company's operations in Laurel and the region's superabundance of timber began to attract the attention of other lumber industrialists. In 1906, the Gilchrist-Fordney Company, whose founders hailed from Alpena, Michigan, began construction on their own lumber mill in Laurel. The Wausau-Southern mill from Wausau, Wisconsin, followed in 1911, and the Marathon mill from Memphis, Tennessee, in 1914. By the end of World War I, Laurel's mills were producing and shipping more yellow pine lumber than those of any other location in the entire world. By the 1920s—the peak of Laurel's lumber production—the area's four mills were producing a total of one million board feet of lumber per day. Laid end to end, that amount of lumber would stretch 189 miles.

The economic prosperity of Laurel's timber era (1893–1937) and "timber families" created the famed Laurel Central Historic District as a byproduct. The area is considered the largest, finest, and most intact collection of the early 20th century architecture in Mississippi and has been listed on the National Register of Historic Places since September 4, 1987, for both its historical value and for its wide variety of architectural styles. Many of the homes and buildings of the district are featured on the current HGTV series Home Town. In addition to influencing a diverse architectural district, the "timber families" of Laurel influenced the building of the town's broad avenues, the design of numerous public parks, and the development of strong public schools.

The city's population grew markedly during the early 20th century because rural people were attracted to manufacturing jobs and the economic takeoff of Masonite International. Mechanization of agriculture reduced the number of farming jobs. In 1942, Howard Wash, a 45-year-old African-American man who had been convicted of murder, was dragged from jail and lynched by a mob. The city reached its peak census population in 1960, and has declined about one third since then.

Geography
Interstate 59 and U.S. Route 11 pass through Laurel, both highways leading southwest  to Hattiesburg and northeast  to Meridian. U.S. Route 84 passes through the south side of the city, leading east  to Waynesboro and west  to Collins. Mississippi Highway 15 passes through the south and west sides of the city, leading northwest  to Bay Springs and southeast  to Richton.

The city lies on a low ridge between Tallahala Creek to the east and Tallahoma Creek to the west. Tallahoma Creek joins Tallahala Creek south of Laurel, and Tallahala Creek continues south to join the Leaf River, part of the Pascagoula River watershed.

Climate
The climate in this area is characterized by hot, humid summers and generally mild to cool winters. According to the Köppen Climate Classification system, Laurel has a humid subtropical climate, abbreviated "Cfa" on climate maps. The area is also prone to tornadoes. On December 28, 1954, an F3 tornado tore directly through the city, injuring 25 people.

Demographics

2020 census

As of the 2020 United States census, there were 17,161 people, 6,825 households, and 4,278 families residing in the city.

2010 census
As of the 2010 census, Laurel had a population of 18,540. The racial and ethnic composition of the population was 61.3% African-American, 29.8% non-Hispanic white, 7.7% Hispanic or Latino, 0.7% Asian, 0.1% Native American, and 1.0% reporting two or more races.

2000 census
As of the census of 2000, there were 18,393 people, 6,925 households, and 4,542 families residing in the city. The population density was 1,192.3 people per square mile (460.2/km2). There were 7,804 housing units at an average density of 505.9 per square mile (195.3/km2). The racial makeup of the city was 55.08% African American, 40.64% White, 0.33% Asian, 0.11% Native American, 0.01% Pacific Islander, 3.17% from other races, and 0.67% from two or more races. Hispanic or Latino of any race were 3.87% of the population.

There were 6,925 households, out of which 29.7% had children under the age of 18 living with them, 37.2% were married couples living together, 23.5% had a female householder with no husband present, and 34.4% were non-families. 30.1% of all households were made up of individuals, and 14.4% had someone living alone who was 65 years of age or older. The average household size was 2.61, and the average family size was 3.21.

In the city, the population was spread out, with 27.9% under the age of 18, 10.1% from 18 to 24, 25.4% from 25 to 44, 19.4% from 45 to 64, and 17.2% who were 65 years of age or older. The median age was 35 years. For every 100 females, there were 85.8 males. For every 100 females age 18 and over, there were 80.5 males.

The median income for a household in the city was $25,988, and the median income for a family was $30,185. Males had a median income of $27,077 versus $17,336 for females. The per capita income for the city was $15,561. 28.9% of the population and 21.4% of families were below the poverty line. 37.5% of those under the age of 18 and 19.3% of those 65 and older were living below the poverty line.

Government

City government consists of a mayor-council form. The mayor is elected at-large. Council members are elected from single-member districts.

City officials
Johnny Magee – Mayor
Jason Capers – Ward 1 Councilman
Kevin Kelly – Ward 2 Councilman
Tony Thaxton – Ward 3 Councilman
George Carmichael – Ward 4 Councilman
Andrea Ellis – Ward 5 Councilwoman
Grace Amos – Ward 6 Councilwoman
Shirley Keys-Jordan – Ward 7 Councilwoman

The United States Postal Service operates the Laurel Post Office and the Choctaw Post Office, both located in Laurel.

The Mississippi Department of Mental Health South Mississippi State Hospital Crisis Intervention Center is in Laurel.

Education

Public schools
Almost all of Laurel is within the Laurel School District. Small portions are in the Jones County School District.

Private schools
 Laurel Christian School
 Laurel Christian High School
 St. John's Day School (affiliated with the Episcopal Church)

Media
 WDAM-TV
 WHLT-TV
 WLAU (99.3 FM, SuperTalk Mississippi)
 The Laurel Leader-Call newspaper
 The Chronicle
 WXRR (104.5 FM, "Rock104")
 WBBN (95.9 FM, "B-95")
 Impact Laurel

Infrastructure

Amtrak's Crescent train connects Laurel with the cities of New York City; Philadelphia; Baltimore; Washington, D.C.; Charlotte, North Carolina; Atlanta; Birmingham, Alabama; and New Orleans. The Laurel Amtrak station is situated at 230 North Maple Street.

Major highways
 Interstate 59

 U.S. Route 84
 U.S. Route 11
 Mississippi Highway 15

Notable people

In popular culture
Laurel residents Erin and Ben Napier are featured in the HGTV series Home Town, which premiered on March 21, 2017. The show portrays renovations of local homes in and near Laurel.

In Tennessee Williams' play A Streetcar Named Desire, fictional Laurel native Blanche DuBois is known here as a "woman of loose morals" who, after the loss of her family estate 'Belle Reve', frequents the Hotel Flamingo as told to Stanley by the merchant Kiefaber. In an argument, Blanche tells Harold Mitchell she's brought many victims into her web, and calls the hotel the Tarantula Arms rather than the Hotel Flamingo.

Singer-songwriter Steve Forbert had a hit with the song "Goin' Down to Laurel" (released on his 1978 album Alive on Arrival) which refers to visiting the town of Laurel.

See also

References

Further reading
 Victoria E. Bynum, The Free State of Jones: Mississippi's Longest Civil War (Chapel Hill: The University of North Carolina Press, 2001, 2016)
 Alex Heard, The Eyes of Willie McGee: A Tragedy of Race, Sex and Secrets in the Jim Crow South (New York: Harper, 2011)
 Nollie W. Hickman, Mississippi Harvest: Lumbering in the Longleaf Pine Belt, 1840–1915 (Jackson: University Press of Mississippi, new edition, 2009)
 Gilbert H. Hoffman and Tony Howe, Yellow Pine Capital: The Laurel, Mississippi Story (Toot Toot Publishing Company, 2010)
 Charles Marsh, The Last Days: A Son's Story of Sin and Segregation at the Dawn of a New South (New York: Basic Books, 2000)
 Cleveland Payne, The Oak Park Story: A Cultural History, 1928–1970 (National Oak Park High School Alumni Association, 1988)
 Cleveland Payne, Laurel: A History of the Black Community, 1882–1962 (Cleveland Payne, 1990)

External links

 City of Laurel official website
 Scrapbook re: Laurel, Mississippi (MUM00404), owned by the University of Mississippi.

Cities in Mississippi
Cities in Jones County, Mississippi
County seats in Mississippi
Cities in Laurel micropolitan area
1882 establishments in Mississippi